Leo Linder (16 August 1910 – 20 June 1974) was a Finnish philatelist who was added to the Roll of Distinguished Philatelists in 1961.

References

Signatories to the Roll of Distinguished Philatelists
1910 births
1974 deaths
Finnish philatelists